William Martin Banks (11 January 1925 – August 1991) was a Welsh rugby union and World Cup winning professional rugby league footballer who played in the 1940s and 1950s.

Background
Billy Banks was born in Maesteg, Wales in 1925. After his rugby league career ended, he became a taxi driver in Huddersfield. He returned frequently to Maesteg to visit family and friends. He died in 1991 aged 66 in Huddersfield, West Yorkshire, England.

Playing career

International honours
Billy Banks represented Combined Nationalities and scored a try in the 15-19 defeat by France at Stade de Gerland, Lyon on Sunday 3 January 1954, won 17 caps for Wales (RL) between 1949–1953 while at Huddersfield and represented Great Britain (RL) while at Huddersfield in 1953 against France and in 1954 against France (2 non-Test matches).

Billy Banks was selected for Great Britain Squad while at Huddersfield for the 1954 Rugby League World Cup in France.

Along with Edward "Ted" Cahill, Gordon Haynes, Keith Holliday, William "Billy" Ivison, Robert "Bob" Kelly, John McKeown, George Parsons and Edward "Ted" Slevin, Billy Banks' only Great Britain appearances came against France prior to 1957, these matches were not considered as Test matches by the Rugby Football League, and consequently caps were not awarded.

Club career
Billy Banks moved from the rugby union (RU) club Maesteg RFC to the professional rugby league (RL) club Leeds in 1946, he made his début for Leeds against Keighley at Headingley Rugby Stadium, Leeds on Saturday 23 February 1946, Banks was transferred from Leeds to Wakefield Trinity in 1946 for £500 (based on increases in average earnings, this would be approximately £49,450 in 2016), he made his début for Wakefield Trinity during December 1946, Banks played his last match for Wakefield Trinity during 1947–48 season, he was transferred from Wakefield Trinity to Huddersfield in August 1948 for £1,850, (based on increases in average earnings, this would be approximately £161,500 in 2016), Banks played 281 games for Huddersfield between 1948 and 1956, he was transferred from Huddersfield to Whitehaven in 1956, and Banks went on to play for  Salford before retiring in 1960, he appears to have scored no drop-goals (or field-goals as they are currently known in Australasia), but prior to the 1974–75 season all goals, whether; conversions, penalties, or drop-goals, scored 2-points, consequently prior to this date drop-goals were often not explicitly documented, therefore '0' drop-goals may indicate drop-goals not recorded, rather than no drop-goals scored. In addition, prior to the 1949–50 season, the archaic field-goal was also still a valid means of scoring points.

Championship final appearances
Billy Banks played  in Huddersfield's 2-20 defeat by Wigan in the Championship Final during the 1949–50 at Maine Road, Manchester on Saturday 13 May 1950.

Challenge Cup Final appearances
Billy Banks played  and scored a try in Huddersfield's 15-10 victory over St. Helens in the 1952–53 Challenge Cup Final during the 1952–53 season at Wembley Stadium, London on Saturday 25 April 1953, in front of a crowd of 89,588.

County Cup Final appearances
Billy Banks played  in Huddersfield's 4-11 defeat by Bradford Northern in the 1949–50 Yorkshire County Cup Final during the 1949–50 season at Headingley Rugby Stadium, Leeds on Saturday 29 October 1949, and played  in the 18-8 victory over Batley in the 1952–53 Yorkshire County Cup Final during the 1952–53 season at Headingley Rugby Stadium, Leeds on Saturday 15 November 1952.

Notable tour matches
Billy Banks played  in Whitehaven's 14-11 victory over Australia in the 1956–57 Kangaroo tour of Great Britain and France match at the Recreation Ground, Whitehaven on Saturday 20 October 1956, in front of a crowd of 10,917.

Genealogical information
Billy Banks was married to Sadie A. (née Williams), daughter of Annie (née Davies) and Gomer Williams of MacGregor Row, Maesteg, Gomer was a coal miner and then groundsman at Maesteg RFC for many years.

References

External links
Sam looks back to stars of yesteryear
Welsh convert XIII

1925 births
1991 deaths
British Empire rugby league team players
Combined Nationalities rugby league team players
Footballers who switched code
Great Britain national rugby league team players
Huddersfield Giants players
Leeds Rhinos players
Maesteg RFC players
Other Nationalities rugby league team players
Rugby league five-eighths
Rugby league halfbacks
Rugby league players from Maesteg
Rugby union players from Maesteg
Rugby union scrum-halves
Salford Red Devils players
Wakefield Trinity players
Wales national rugby league team players
Welsh rugby league players
Welsh rugby union players
Whitehaven R.L.F.C. players